Les Saignantes (English: The Bloodettes) is a 2005 futuristic science fiction erotic thriller film. Set in the year 2025, the film follows two sex workers as they attempt to dispose of the corpse of a political leader who dies as a client of one of the women. The film also addresses political corruption in Cameroon through its plot and use of intertitles. The film won the Silver Stallion (second best African film) at Fespaco 2007 and the Best Actress awards with the special mention of the jury.

Cast
 Adèle Ado as Majolie
 Dorylia Calmel as Chouchou
 Emile Abossolo M'Bo as Minister of State
 Josephine Ndagnou as Natou
 Essindi Mindja as Essomba
 Alain Dzukam as Rokko
 Veronique Mendouga as Dr. Amanga
 Bekate Meyong as Mamba
 Thierry Mintamack as Tony

Awards
 Adèle Ado won Best Actress for her work in Les Saignantes at the 2007 Ouagadougou Panafrican Film and Television Festival.
 Jean-Pierre Bekolo won the "Silver Etalon de Yennega" for his work on the film at the 2007 Ouagadougou Panafrican Film and Television Festival.

See also
Afrofuturism in film

External links
 
The Bloodettes - Les Saignantes on Kanopy

2005 films
Cameroonian drama films
2005 science fiction films
2000s French-language films
2000s erotic thriller films
Afrofuturist films
French science fiction films
2000s French films